Vanity's Price is a lost 1924 American silent drama film directed by Roy William Neill and starring Anna Q. Nilsson. It was produced by the Gothic Productions company and released by FBO.

Cast
Anna Q. Nilsson as Vanna Du Maurier
Stuart Holmes as Henri De Greve
Wyndham Standing as Richard Dowling
Arthur Rankin as Teddy, Vanna's son
Lucille Ricksen as Sylvia, Teddy's fiancée
Robert Bolder as Bill Connors, Theatrical Manager
Cissy Fitzgerald as Mrs. Connors
Dot Farley as Katherine, Vanna's Maid
Charles Newton as Butler
Rowfat-Bey Haliloff as Dancer

References

External links

1924 films
American silent feature films
Films directed by Roy William Neill
Lost American films
American black-and-white films
1924 drama films
Silent American drama films
Film Booking Offices of America films
1924 lost films
Lost drama films
1920s American films